The Cap de la Nau or Cabo de la Nao, literally Cape of the Ship, is a headland located central-eastern coastal Spain on the Gulf of Valencia, Mediterranean Sea. In English, it is also known as Cape Nao.

Geography

Cap de la Nau is in the municipality of Xàbia, within the Mediterranean province of Alicante, in the comarca of Marina Alta, and is the easternmost point of the Valencian Community. It marks the southern limit of the Gulf of Valencia, and points towards the nearby island of Formentera in the Balearic Islands.

The cape is rocky, steep and mostly composed of limestone.  Beneath the headland there is a large cave, known as Cova dels Orgues (or Cueva de los Órganos in Spanish) that can only be approached from the sea.

Lighthouse

See also 
 Cap de Sant Antoni

Landforms of the Valencian Community
Nao, Cabo de la
Geography of the Province of Alicante